Joshua Ostrovsky (born February 18, 1982), known professionally as The Fat Jewish, is an American entrepreneur, social media influencer, author and plus size model.

Early life
Ostrovsky was born and raised in New York City to a Russian-born radiologist father Paul, and a nutritionist mother Rebecca. He grew up in Manhattan on the Upper West Side. He attended several schools, starting at the Packer school in Brooklyn, and then attending Trevor Day School and the Dwight School, both on the Upper West Side. As a very young actor, he appeared in several commercials, including one for Hershey's. After attending New York University and Skidmore College and being expelled from both, he enrolled in State University of New York at Albany, graduating in 2006 with a bachelor of arts in journalism.

Career

Swish Beverages
Ostrovsky is a co-founder of Swish Beverages, which launched White Girl Rosé in 2015, followed by the Babe family of sparkling canned wines. In June 2019, it was announced that Anheuser-Busch InBev had acquired Swish Beverages, marking the brewer's largest wine investment to date.

Social media
In 2011, Ostrovsky started an Instagram account with the handle "TheFatJewish". The account went viral in 2013 after Ostrovsky posted a video parodying SoulCycle, in which he led a spin class for homeless people on Citi Bikes parked on the street. In 2013, his Instagram account was suspended due to inappropriate content. In response, he organized a rally held outside Instagram's New York office. The protest was live-streamed on Vice.com, and his account was restored after 15 minutes. In 2014 The New York Times wrote that "he has parlayed a profane sense of humor that mocks the tropes of social-media culture and the hipsters who propagate them; an apparent affection for pot, pets and grandparents; and his own slovenly, outlandish physical appearance… into a huge web following." Time magazine named Ostrovsky to its 2015 list of The 30 Most Influential People on the Internet. As of December 2022, he had over 10 million followers on Instagram.

Ostrovsky has been hired to do product placement in his social media posts by companies including Burger King, Virgin Mobile, Apple, Budweiser, Weight Watchers, and Stella Artois. In 2015 he signed on as a spokesperson for Seamless.

Film, television, and commercials
In 2009, Ostrovsky was hired as an entertainment reporter interviewing celebrities on The Daily 10 on E! He later hosted the rap interview web series An Intimate Conversation. He sold a show parodying the Williamsburg, Brooklyn hipster culture to Amazon in 2013, which went unproduced. In 2014, he signed a deal to develop a scripted series for Comedy Central, based on his life. He signed with Creative Artists Agency in 2015, and that year began making regular appearances on Bloomberg News, starred in a Bud Light commercial that aired during Super Bowl XLIX, and appeared in the music video for DNCE's "Cake by the Ocean", as well as "Boys" by Charli XCX. He has appeared as himself in numerous reality television series, including 3AM and The Real Housewives of Beverly Hills. He has also played supporting roles in several films, including the teen comedy Status Update, starring Ross Lynch and Olivia Holt. He was featured in a 2017 ad campaign for Malibu Rum. He appears in the documentary The American Meme, which premiered at the 2018 Tribeca Film Festival.

Modeling and fashion
In June 2012, Ostrovsky signed a modeling contract with One Management. He claims to be the world's first male plus-size model. He appeared in a photo spread in Inked magazine's May 2015 issue, and was featured on the covers of the magazines treats! in 2016 and Nude in 2017.

At New York Fashion Week on September 16, 2015, his Dad Fashion Show debuted his collection of men's apparel.

Book
Ostrovsky formerly hosted a radio show on Apple Music Beats 1 called Money, Pizza, Respect. The book of the same name, a collection of personal essays and images, was published by Grand Central Publishing in 2015. The book's cover parodies the cover of Walter Isaacson's 2011 biography Steve Jobs.

Music
While at SUNY Albany, Ostrovsky was a member of the hip hop trio Team Facelift, where he first started going by the name Fat Jew. He has said that the moniker was inspired by one of his counselors at Eisner Camp and by Screw magazine publisher Al Goldstein. Team Facelift formed in 2004, signed with Duck Down Records and released the album Mixed Emotions in 2006. They broke up in 2010.

In September 2016, Ostrovsky announced his Major Lazer tribute band Major Behavior, formed with DJ Maachew Bentley and billed as the world's first EDM tribute band. Major Behavior toured in 2016 as a part of Ostrovsky's IRL Tour. For the second IRL Tour in 2017, Major Behavior toured with Dillon Francis, RL Grime and Party Favor. Major Behavior was joined onstage by Major Lazer's Diplo during a May 2017 performance in Chicago. In 2018, Ostrovsky hosted a radio show called Major Behavior on Diplo's Revolution, an electronic music channel on SiriusXM.

Controversy
In 2015, Ostrovsky was accused of posting screenshots of other comedians' jokes on Instagram and Twitter without their permission, and with the credits cropped out. After several stories were published about this behavior, Ostrovsky edited his past posts to credit the authors of the jokes.

Personal life
Ostrovsky and blogger Katie Sturino were married in 2014; they announced their divorce in 2016. Ostrovsky and Caitlin King have a son named Buddy, born in February 2021.

Ostrovsky is an ordained minister and has officiated many wedding ceremonies, including a spontaneous wedding at Nikki Beach in Miami in December 2017.

Bibliography
 Money Pizza Respect (Grand Central Publishing, 2015)

Filmography

References

External links
 Official website
 

1982 births
Living people
American television hosts
Jewish American male comedians
American Internet celebrities
American winemakers
Plus-size models
University at Albany, SUNY alumni
People from the Upper West Side
Comedians from New York City
Male actors from New York City
Musicians from New York City
Businesspeople from New York City
21st-century American comedians
Participants in American reality television series
21st-century American Jews